Atlanersa (also Atlanarsa) was a Kushite ruler of the Napatan kingdom of Nubia, reigning for about a decade in the mid-7th century BC. He was the successor of Tantamani, the last ruler of the 25th Dynasty of Egypt, and possibly a son of Taharqa or less likely of Tantamani, while his mother was a queen whose name is only partially preserved. Atlanersa's reign immediately followed the collapse of Nubian control over Egypt, which witnessed the Assyrian conquest of Egypt and then the beginning of the Late Period under Psamtik I. The same period also saw the progressive cultural integration of Egyptian beliefs by the Kushite civilization.

Atlanersa may have fathered his successor Senkamanisken with his consort Malotaral, although Senkamanisken could also be his brother. He built a pyramid in the necropolis of Nuri, now conjecturally believed to be Nuri 20 and may also have started a funerary chapel in the same necropolis, now called Nuri 500. Atlanersa was the second Nubian king to build a pyramid in Nuri after Taharqa. Excavations of his pyramid produced many small artefacts which are now on display in the Museum of Fine Arts in Boston, US. Atlanersa's most-prominent construction is his temple to the syncretic god Osiris-Dedwen in Jebel Barkal called B700, which he finished and had time to only partially decorate. This suggests that he died unexpectedly. The temple entrance was to be flanked with two colossal statues of the king, one of which was completed and set in place and is now in the National Museum of Sudan.

Royal family

Parents
Atlanersa was the son of king Taharqa or less probably of Atlanersa's immediate predecessor Tantamani. Specialists, such as László Török, who contend that Atlanersa's father was Taharqa, explain the intervening reign of Tantamani by positing that Atlanersa might have been too young to ascend the throne at the death of his father and that attempting a military reconquest of Egypt required a strong king. A cultural explanation is also possible: Napatan society might have recognized seniority and maturity as valid arguments for inheriting a throne. In this sense a young heir to the throne would be overlooked in favor of someone older until they reached maturity. At this point, should the king die, the right to the throne of the original heir would be reinstated. If Atlanersa was indeed a son of Taharqa, then he was a cross-cousin of Tantamani.

Atlanersa's mother was a queen who appeared on a pylon scene at Jebel Barkal Temple B700 but whose name is not fully preserved and is only known to have ended in [...]salka. She bore the title of "Great one of the Imat-scepter, noblewoman".

Consorts and children
Atlanersa was married to at least two of his sisters: Yeturow, who bore the title of "wife of the king, daughter of the king, sister of the king, mistress of Egypt", and Khaliset (also known as Khalese) who was "noblewoman, lady of the Imat-sceptre, singer, great daughter of the king". Khaliset was intended to be the mother of Atlanersa's heir, as indicated by her titles, but it may have been another of Atlanersa's consorts, Malotaral "mistress of Kush", who was the mother of Atlanersa's heir Senkamanisken. Further potential consorts of Atlanersa have been identified: his sister Peltasen and queens K[...] and Taba[...]. Finally, there is a distinct possibility that Amenirdis II, the Divine Adoratrice of Amun in Thebes, was married to Atlanersa. In addition, she may have been his sister.

One daughter of Atlanersa by one of his wives is known: Queen Nasalsa, sister-wife of Senkamanisken and mother of Anlamani and Aspelta. It is also possible that Queen Amanimalel was his daughter.
Atlanersa's successor Senkamanisken may have been his son, but could instead have been his brother.

Attestations and activities

Temple B700

Foundation tablets bearing Atlanersa's name show that he started a temple dedicated to the syncretic god Osiris-Dedwen at Jebel Barkal, now known as B700. The choice for this location followed from its closeness to the "Pure Mountain"—the ancient name of Jebel Barkal—and the presence of a small New Kingdom chapel there. It is unclear whether Atlanersa ordered the destruction of this chapel to make place for B700, or whether the chapel was already ruined by this time.

The temple, now ruined, was entered through a pylon and comprised a small court followed by an inner sanctuary. The court and sanctuary both had four columns, with palm capitals and papyrus flower bundle capitals, respectively. The inner sanctuary was inscribed with a lengthy hymn to Osiris, possibly indirectly referring to the deceased Taharqa. The walls were further decorated with reliefs depicting the activities performed during the coronation of the king, almost all of which have now disappeared. Beneath two of the corners of the inner room were two foundation deposits buried at the start of the temple construction, notably with the tablets showing Atlanersa's name. A stand for a sacred barque stood at the centre of the sanctuary. The purpose of the stand was to support the barque of the god Amun of Napata when it visited the temple from the nearby Temple B500.

Atlanersa's name was present on a scene inscribed on the front pylon of the temple, now destroyed. The decoration of the pylon was predominantly made during Senkamanisken's reign, yet it depicted queens Yeturow, K[...] and Khaliset, who are implied to be both Atlanersa's wives as well as his sisters. Finally,  Atlanersa's name is written on a granite altar from the same temple.

The progression of the temple construction suggests that Atlanersa died unexpectedly, shortly after completing the construction works and the decoration of the two interior rooms—as attested by the presence of his name there—but before completing the decoration of the exterior. This task was finished under Senkamanisken who added inscriptions of his own on the columns and front pylon, and donated a small obelisk. A colossal statue of Atlanersa was placed on the western side of the temple entrance, where it was discovered by Reisner, albeit toppled with its head cut-off. It is now in the National Museum of Sudan.

Reliefs on the barque stand and on the sanctuary walls show Atlanersa holding up the heavens and performing the ceremony of uniting the two lands, originally solely a part of the coronation of Egyptian pharaohs but subsequently an integral part of the Kushite royal legitimation. Thus, Atlanersa ruled at a pivotal time which saw the cultural integration of Egyptian concepts and institutional continuity between the 25th Dynasty state and the subsequent Napatan kingdom of Kush. This further indicates that, originally, the temple's importance lay in its role during the accession of a king to the throne: following the death of his predecessor, the king went to the temple "in order to be confirmed in his new role by Amun and giving the office of kingship renewed life". After Senkamanisken's rule, the temple might have served as a mortuary temple for Atlanersa and, even later, for all deceased Kushite kings.

Temple B500
Atlanersa is the only Kushite king of the mid-7th century BC whose statue was absent from the statue cache uncovered in Jebel Barkal Temple B500 by George Andrew Reisner in 1916. Statues of Tantamani, Senkamanisken, Anlamani and Aspelta were uncovered there.

Old Dongola, Tombos and Thebes
A scarab seal of Atlanersa, now in the Louvre Museum, may originate from Thebes. At Old Dongola, a fragmentary obelisk bearing Atlanersa's name was discovered in a church, where it had been reused as a column.

In a quarry near Tombos, a statue of the same size and shape and made of the same stone as the statue of Atlanersa from B700 was uncovered unfinished, almost certainly left there because it had cracked. The statue was likely destined to be the eastern pendant of the colossal statue at the west of the entrance of B700 and therefore represents Atlanersa.

Tomb

Following excavations at the necropolis of Nuri, Reisner proposed to attribute the pyramid Nuri 20 to Atlanersa on chronological grounds. Nuri 20 is the second-oldest pyramid of the necropolis after that of Taharqa and did not belong to Senkamanisken, whose pyramid Nuri 3 was built subsequently. Reisner's arguments have been broadly accepted. Atlanersa was the second king, following Taharqa, to choose Nuri for burial; this fact motivates certain specialists—including Török, Timothy Kendall and El-Hassan Ahmed Mohamed—to posit that Atlanersa was Taharqa's son, and that he chose this necropolis to be close to and honor his father.

The pyramid is made of sandstone masonry, with a steep slope at 66° and a surface area of c. . The pyramid complex is surrounded by a sandstone enclosure and comprises a small chapel adjacent to the pyramid eastern side. At its center, the chapel housed an offering stand on which was an offering table, both of grey granite. The table was originally inscribed with reliefs and hieroglyphs, now illegible.

The pyramid substructures were accessed from a stair of 36 steps, starting at ground level east of the chapel. At the end of the staircase was a wall of masonry meant to bar thieves from entering the tomb, which comprised two chambers. The latter contained a lid and several fragments of canopic jars, 11 or 12 canopic clay figures of gods and goddesses including Osiris, Imsety and Neith, a few inlay pieces of lapis lazuli, obsidian and slate (all originally from a sarcophagus), and fragmentary faience shawabtis.

Excavations of the pyramid yielded numerous objects including fragments of jars and alabaster vessels, one of which was inscribed with Tantamani's cartouches, several bowls, a beryl scarab attached to a gold wire loop, pieces of gold foil, a faience pendant with Atlanersa's cartouche, Menat amulets and beads, pieces of paste, and further fragments of shawabtis. In total, 15 complete shawabtis were recovered of over 235 found in the pyramid, all c.  in size. Many of these objects are now on display at the Boston Museum of Fine Arts.

A nearby rectangular building of brown sandstone, now known as Nuri 500, may have been a funerary chapel. It yielded an alabaster votive tablet bearing Atlanersa's cartouche.

Political situation

Chronology

Atlanersa might have been born around 671 BC or shortly after, when Taharqa's heir apparent Nes-Anhuret was captured in Memphis by Esarhaddon. Atlanersa reigned for a decade in the mid-7th century BC, ascending to the throne around 653 BC and dying around 643 BC, a period of Nubian history now called the early Napatan period.
This makes him a contemporary of Ashurbanipal (fl. c. 668–627 BC) and Psamtik I (fl. c. 664–610 BC).

Collapse of the 25th Dynasty
By the end of Taharqa's reign, the 25th Dynasty state was in crisis, on the losing side of a war against the Neo-Assyrian Empire. From c. 665–664 BC, Taharqa and Tantamani had lost control of Lower Egypt, which came under the power of Assyrian vassals including Necho I and his son in Sais, the future great pharaoh Psamtik I. In 663 BC, Tantamani managed a short-lived reconquest of Memphis, killing Necho I in the process, but was beaten during the ensuing campaign by Ashurbanipal, which finished with the sack of Thebes that same year. Weakened, the Kushites could not resist the subsequent rise of the Twenty-sixth Dynasty of Egypt under the impulse of Psamtik I, who proceeded south quickly during the remainder of Tantamani's reign, definitively expelling him from Upper Egypt c. 656 BC. Thus, in contrast to his predecessors, Atlanersa's kingdom was restricted to the region of Kush, south of Elephantine, and its seat of power was Napata. The Kushites would nonetheless continue to wield a significant influence in the Theban region of Upper Egypt where an aristocracy of Nubian descent had established itself in the 8th century BC, in particular amongst the high clergy of Amun.

Despite these developments, Atlanersa adopted the fivefold titulary in the style of Egyptian pharaohs; gave himself the epithets of "Son of Ra" and "King of Upper and Lower Egypt" in his inscriptions; and had the gods promise him lordship over Egypt in exchange for Temple B700.
While Atlanersa's Horus name, "Founder of the two lands", is identical with that of the much earlier king of the 13th Dynasty, Neferhotep I, Török proposes that it is rather based on the titles of Theban kings of the Third Intermediate Period. For example, starting with the High-priest of Amun Herihor (fl. c. 1080 BC), a number of rulers of the 21st and 22nd Dynasties were called "son of Amun whom he placed on his throne to be founder of the Two Lands", a prominent example being Osorkon I (fl. c. 900 BC). In the same vein, Atlanersa's nebty name of "Mery Maat" was also borne by the kings Siamun (fl. c. 970 BC), Osorkon II (fl. c. 850 BC) and Shoshenq III (fl. c. 810 BC).

Serge Sauneron and Jean Yoyotte proposed that either Atlanersa or Senkamanisken faced an incursion of Egyptian troops under the command of  Psamtik I, who very probably also established a garrison on Elephantine to guard the border. This hypothesis is contested by Török, who points to the lack of direct evidence. In any case, a raid on Napata by the Egyptians did take place during the later reign of Psamtik II c. 593 BC. During this raid, the colossal statue of Atlanersa in front of Temple B700 was toppled and its head cut off.

See also
 List of monarchs of Kush

Notes

References

Sources

 
 
 
 
 
 
 
 
 
 
 
 
 
 
 
 
 
 
 
 
 
 
 
 
 
 
 
 
 
 
 
 
 
 
 
 
 
 
 
 
 
 
 
 

7th-century BC monarchs of Kush
7th-century BC rulers